Season for Assassins (also known as The Time of the Assassin and Mad Men) is a 1975 Italian poliziottesco-drama film written and directed by Marcello Andrei.

Cast 
 Joe Dallesandro as Piero Giaranaldi
 Martin Balsam as Commissioner Catrone
 Magali Noel as Rossana
 Rossano Brazzi as Father Eugenio
 Guido Leontini as Brigadeer

Production
Filmed at Incir-De Paolis in Rome and on location in Rome.

Release
Season for Assassins was released in Italy on December 27, 1975 where it was distributed by Agora. The film grossed a total of 354,087,000 lire on its theatrical release.

Notes

References

External links

1970s Italian-language films
Poliziotteschi films
1970s action films
1975 crime drama films
Films directed by Marcello Andrei
Films shot in Rome
1975 films
1970s Italian films